István Mátrai (born 12 November 1949) is a Hungarian sports shooter. He competed in the mixed 50 metre rifle three positions event at the 1980 Summer Olympics.

References

1949 births
Living people
Hungarian male sport shooters
Olympic shooters of Hungary
Shooters at the 1980 Summer Olympics
Sport shooters from Budapest